Stoke may refer to:

Places

Canada 
 Stoke, Quebec

New Zealand 
 Stoke, New Zealand

United Kingdom

Berkshire 
 Stoke Row

Bristol 
 Stoke Bishop
 Stoke Gifford
 Bradley Stoke
 Little Stoke
 Harry Stoke
 Stoke Lodge

Buckinghamshire 
 Stoke Hammond
 Stoke Mandeville
 Stoke Poges

Cheshire 
 Stoke, Cheshire East
 Stoke, Cheshire West and Chester, a civil parish

Cornwall 
 Stoke Climsland

Devon 
 Stoke, Plymouth
 Stoke, Torridge, in Hartland parish
 Stoke Canon
 Stoke Fleming
 Stoke Gabriel
 Stoke Rivers

Dorset 
 Stoke Abbott
 Stoke Wake

Gloucestershire 
 Stoke Orchard

Hampshire 
 Stoke, Basingstoke and Deane
 Stoke, Hayling Island
 Stoke Charity

Herefordshire 
 Stoke Bliss
 Stoke Edith
 Stoke Lacy
 Stoke Prior, Herefordshire

Kent 
 Stoke, Kent

Leicestershire 
 Stoke Golding

Lincolnshire 
 Stoke Rochford

London 
 Stoke Newington

Milton Keynes 
 Stoke Goldington

Norfolk 
 Stoke Ash
 Stoke Ferry
 Stoke Holy Cross

Northamptonshire 
 Stoke Bruerne
 Stoke Doyle

Nottinghamshire 
 Stoke Bardolph

Oxfordshire 
 Stoke Lyne
 Stoke Row
 Stoke Talmage

Rutland 
 Stoke Dry

Shropshire 
 Stoke on Tern
 Stoke St. Milborough

Somerset 
 Stoke Pero
 Stoke St Gregory
 Stoke St Mary
 Stoke St Michael
 Stoke-sub-Hamdon
 Stoke Trister

Staffordshire 
 Stoke-on-Trent
 Stoke-upon-Trent, a town in the city of Stoke-on-Trent

Suffolk 
 Stoke, Suffolk (a suburb of Ipswich)
 Stoke Ash
 Stoke-by-Clare
 Stoke-by-Nayland

Surrey 
 Stoke d'Abernon
 Stoke next Guildford

West Midlands 
 Stoke Heath, Coventry
 Stoke Aldermoor, a suburb of Coventry, West Midlands (also nearby Stoke and Stoke Park)

Worcestershire 
 Stoke, Worcestershire, a civil parish in Bromsgrove, Worcestershire
 Stoke Heath, Worcestershire
 Stoke Prior, Worcestershire
 Stoke Pound, a place in Worcestershire

United States 
 Stoke (Loudoun County, Virginia), a historic farm property

Facilities and strucutres
 Stoke Bridge, over River Gipping, in Ipswich, England, UK
 Stoke Tunnel (disambiguation)
 Stoke railway station (disambiguation)
 Stoke Bank, a railway incline on the East Coast Main Line, England, UK
 Stoke EfW, an incinerator in Sideway, Stoke-on-Trent, England, UK

People and characters
 John Stoke (disambiguation)
 Melis Stoke (1235–1305), Dutch writer
 Lou Stoke, a character on the ITV show Bad Girls

Other uses
 Stoke City F.C., an English football club based in Stoke-on-Trent in the UK
 Stoke College, Stoke-by-Clare, Suffolk, England, UK
 Battle of Stoke Field (1487), in England; War of the Roses
 Stoke IPA and other beers, made by McCashin's Brewery, Nelson, New Zealand
 Stoke Space, an American space launch company.

See also 

 
 Stokes (disambiguation), (in particular, stoke is an erroneous singular of stokes (sing. and pl), a unit of kinematic viscosity)
 Stoked (disambiguation)
 Stoker (disambiguation)
 Stoke City (disambiguation)
 Stoke Hall (disambiguation)
 Stoke Heath (disambiguation)
 Stoke Park (disambiguation)
 Stoke Prior (disambiguation)
 Stoke-on-Trent (disambiguation)
 Old Stoke (disambiguation)
 North Stoke (disambiguation)
 East Stoke (disambiguation)
 South Stoke (disambiguation)
 West Stoke